Urania is a genus of moths in the family Uraniidae.

The genus name Urania is New Latin from Latin Urania from Ancient Greek Ουρανία, one of the Muses, literally 'The Heavenly One'.

Distribution
The genus includes relatively large day-flying moths that are found in the Central American and South American regions.

Species
 Urania boisduvalii Guérin-Meneville, 1829 – (Cuba)
 Urania brasiliensis Swainson, 1833 – (Brazil)
 Urania leilus Linnaeus, 1758 – green-banded urania (tropical South America east of the Andes)
 Urania fulgens Walker, 1854 – urania swallowtail moth (Mexico, through Central America to northwestern South America)
 Urania poeyi Herrich-Schäffer, 1866 – (eastern Cuba)
 Urania sloanus Cramer, 1779 – Sloane's urania (Jamaica; extinct  1894)

References

External links

Uraniidae
Moth genera